Ernest Blake (31 March 1912 – December 2002) was a British water polo player who competed in the 1936 Summer Olympics. He was part of the British team which finished eighth in the 1936 tournament. He played once, in Great Britain's 4–4 draw with the Netherlands.

References

1912 births
2002 deaths
English male water polo players
Olympic water polo players of Great Britain
Water polo players at the 1936 Summer Olympics